Ralf Richter (born 17 August 1957 in Essen) is a German actor. He debuted as the crude sailor "Frenssen" in the Academy Award-nominated 1981 film Das Boot and frequently appeared in German TV series. He played main roles in German films such as Bang Boom Bang (1999), Fußball ist unser Leben (1999) or If It Don't Fit, Use a Bigger Hammer (2002).

His younger brother Frank is known as musician FM Einheit (ex-Einstürzende Neubauten).

Selected filmography

External links

1957 births
German male film actors
German male television actors
20th-century German male actors
21st-century German male actors
Living people
Actors from Essen